Events from the year 1994 in South Korea.

Incumbents
President: Kim Young-sam 
Prime Minister: 
 until April 29: Lee Hoi-chang 
 April 29 – December 17: Lee Yung-dug 
 starting December 17: Lee Hong-koo

Births

January 
 January 6 – JB, singer and actor
 January 14 – Kai, singer and actor
 January 18 – Minzy, singer, rapper, and dancer
 January 20 – Lee Chang-min, footballer
 January 21 
 Kang Seung-yoon, singer and actor
 Lim Kim, singer and actress
 January 23 – Kwak Min-jeong, figure skater
 January 24 – Yoo Young-jae, singer

February 
 February 5 – Lee Jong-hyun, basketball player
 February 10
 Seulgi, singer
 Son Na-eun, singer and actress
 February 11 – Seo Ji-soo, singer
 February 12 – Park Subin, singer and TV host
 February 15 – Jin Se-yeon, actress
 February 18 – J-Hope, rapper, singer
 February 21 – Wendy, singer
 February 22 – Nam Joo-hyuk, model and actor
 February 25 – Yang Ha-eun, table tennis player

March 
 March 3 – Jung Min-ah, actress
 March 22 – Ha Sung-woon, singer
 March 25 – An Baul, judoka
 March 29 – Sulli, singer and actress (d. 2019)

April 
 April 12 – Oh Se-hun, singer and rapper
 April 22 – Lee Hyo-jin, handball player
 April 23 - Song Kang, actor
 April 28 – Kim Kyung-hyun, bobsledder
 April 30 – Chae Seo-jin, actress

May 
 May 3
 Kim Hye-jin, swimmer
 Shin Mi-hwa, bobsledder
 May 10 – Nam Tae-hyun, singer and actor
 May 13 – Kim Jong-hyuk, footballer
 May 27 – Park So-young, badminton player
 May 28 – Son Yeon-jae, rhythmic gymnast
 May 31 – Shim Eun-kyung, actress

June 
 June 1 – Yun Seung-hyun, high jumper
 June 3 – Lee Dong-soo, footballer
 June 9 – Lee Hye-ri, singer and actress
 June 14
 Moon Tae-il, singer
 Lee So-hee, badminton player
 June 23 – HoYeon Jung, model and actress

July 
 July 5 – Jeon Jong-seo, actress
 July 10 – Chae Soo-bin, actress
 July 14 – Kim Dong-hyeon, footballer
  July 18 - Lee Yoo-mi, actress
 July 22 – Lee So-ra, tennis player

August 
 August 6 – Won Seon-pil, handball player
 August 10 – Chun In-gee, golfer
 August 16 – Niel, singer and actor
 August 25 – Lee Jang-mi, badminton player
 August 26 – Yezi, singer and rapper
 August 30 – Heo Young-ji, singer and actress

September 
 September 12 – RM, rapper, songwriter, and record producer
 September 22 – Jinyoung, singer and actor
 September 23 – Mijoo, singer
 September 25 – Min Do-hee, singer and actress
 September 28 – Kim Tae-yun, speed skater

October 
 October 4
 Baek Ee-seul, field hockey player
 Jung Il-hoon, rapper, actor, and composer
 October 10 – Bae Suzy, singer and actress 
 October 26 – Lee Joo-heon, rapper 
 October 31 – Jaehyuck Choi, composer

November 
 November 17 – Kim Ye-ji, rower
 November 18 - Han So-hee, actress
 November 30 – Yun Yea-ji, figure skater

December 
 December 6 – Shin Seung-chan, badminton player
 December 19 – Kim Dong-jun, footballer
 December 21 – Ahn Hyeon-beom, footballer
 December 24 – Han Seung-woo, singer
 December 25 - Kim Min-kyu, actor

Deaths

 January 17 – Chung Il-kwon, politician, diplomat and soldier (b. 1917)
 January 18 – Moon Ik-hwan, pastor, theologian, poet, and activist (b. 1918)
 May 22 – Jang Il-soon, educator and social and environment activist (b. 1928)

See also
List of South Korean films of 1994
Years in Japan
Years in North Korea

References

 
South Korea
Years of the 20th century in South Korea
1990s in South Korea
South Korea